Accelerate is the 14th studio album by American alternative rock band R.E.M., released on March 31, 2008 in Europe, and on April 1 in North America. Produced with Jacknife Lee, Accelerate was intended as a departure from the 2004 album Around the Sun. R.E.M. previewed most of the album's tracks during a five-night residency at the Olympia Theatre in Dublin, Republic of Ireland, and recorded the album in a nine-week schedule.

The album was heralded as a return to form for the band, receiving a warm reception from music critics and achieving a 79/100 rating on Metacritic. Reviewers often complimented the aggressive, purposeful sound of the songs, with Q magazine critic Keith Cameron stating that "Accelerate is the sound of a band having enjoyed a good word with themselves—and us." It was their last album to be accompanied by a tour, as the band had decided against touring for their next (and final) album Collapse into Now before disbanding.

Background and recording

R.E.M.'s previous record Around the Sun (2004) only sold 240,000 copies in the United States and was poorly received by critics. The band members later expressed displeasure with the album. Guitarist Peter Buck told Q, "I personally hated it. [Quickly] No, hated is too hard. I hated the fact that it wasn't as good as it should've been." Buck admitted the band felt pressure to subsequently make a better record; he told Q, "Even Michael [Stipe] was going, 'Y'know, if we make another bad record, it's over.' It's like, 'No kidding.'"

Buck and bassist Mike Mills began working on instrumental demos in winter 2007, assisted by touring members Bill Rieflin and Scott McCaughey. The music they wrote was faster and more aggressive than other material they had written in years. Mills suggested the band work out its new songs in a live setting before recording them, as it had done in its early years. Between June 30 and July 5, 2007, R.E.M. played a five-night series of shows at the Olympia Theatre, Dublin, Ireland. In this series of shows—dubbed "working rehearsals" by the band, many songs on Accelerate were debuted, with many of them still as works in progress. These performances would later be released as Live at The Olympia in 2009.

At the urging of The Edge of U2, R.E.M. chose to record the album with producer Jacknife Lee. Following the Olympia Theatre residency, R.E.M. scheduled three-week recording sessions in three different cities in order to keep its focus. The tight recording schedule prevented Stipe from spending too much time working on his lyrics and vocal parts. Stipe told Spin, "I work really well under pressure, and the guys know that all too well... So the pace forced me to kind of spit stuff out." The group mixed the album in a London studio in 10 days. Regarding the recording process, Stipe said, "We spent less time making this record than we have in 20 years."

Music
The members of R.E.M. were reluctant to pin down the style of the new album so as not to create wayward expectations. The new material featured in the Dublin concerts demonstrated a much more stripped-down, guitar-driven sound than had been featured on the band's recent releases, and Mike Mills indicated that the shows gave a good indication of the band's direction. Stipe said his lyrics on Accelerate were inspired by the contemporary state of the nation, saying, "When the empire is going down the toilet, it's easy to write great, angry songs."

Described in sound as "ballyhooed hard rock", Sputnikmusic proclaimed Accelerate "a ballsier return to [the band's] punk roots".

Promotion
On January 1, 2008, R.E.M. launched the website NinetyNights.com, on which a new short clip from Accelerate was posted daily until the album's release. In February, R.E.M. launched the website supernaturalsuperserious.com with eleven videos to promote the album. A week later, R.E.M. launched remaccelerate.com, a web page for promoting and aggregating news about the album itself.

In late March 2008, the band released Accelerate as a digital web streams on iLike six days prior to the American release of its physical album in April. Michael Stipe said R.E.M. wanted to experiment with its distribution system, citing the change in the music industry since the release of Around the Sun. A deluxe edition of the album was released in addition to the standard edition; it includes a DVD featuring filmmaker Vincent Moon's film 6 Days, which includes behind-the-scenes footage and performances of various songs on the album. Two B-side tracks, "Red Head Walking" and "Airliner," are included as bonus tracks, along with a 64-page booklet. The vinyl version consists of two 12 inch discs each running at 45 RPM, and contains the full album on CD.

A brief tour, the last of the group's tenure, took place in 2008. It covered Europe, North America, and Latin America.

Release and reception

Accelerate was the band's highest-charting release since 1996's New Adventures in Hi-Fi.  It debuted at number two on the Billboard 200 with first week sales of 115,000 copies, went on to sell more than 353,000 copies in the United States and became the band's eighth album to top the British album charts.  "Supernatural Superserious" was released as the album's first single. The second single "Hollow Man" was released in June 2008, with "Man-Sized Wreath" following in August. According to Billboard, Accelerate stayed 18 weeks on the Billboard 200 chart.

 Rolling Stone gave the album four out of five stars, with critic David Fricke praising the group's aggressive sound, writing, "Stipe has not sounded this viscerally engaged in his singing and poetically lethal in his writing since the twilight of the Reagan administration." NME reviewer Alan Woodhouse, similarly applauding the group's return to its previous sound, gave Accelerate an eight out of 10 rating, concluding "Accelerate is by some considerable distance R.E.M.'s best and most cohesive album since [former drummer] Bill Berry left, and crucially echoes a time when they made their best music, if not necessarily their biggest-selling." Q reviewer Keith Cameron wrote that unlike Around the Sun, "Accelerate is the sound of a band having enjoyed a good word with themselves—and us." Cameron described the album's first three songs as "powerful as the first half of 1986's Lifes Rich Pageant," but commented that the album suffers through a "midway dip that afflicts even the best R.E.M. album."

Time reviewer Josh Tyrangiel praised guitarist Buck's "resurgence" and "propulsive riffs," but also wrote, "R.E.M.'s 14th album never quite generates the moody atmospherics of their first 10; it's a little hard to lose yourself in something that doesn't pause long enough for you to get lost." Uncut gave the album 1.5 out of five stars. Reviewer John Mulvey stated, "Accelerate is a simple, pragmatic record built on an uncomfortable truth: sometimes, even the best bands have to retrace their steps, if only to remind themselves what they're really good at."

Accolades
In 2009, Consequence of Sound ranked the album at number 37 in its list of the top 100 albums of the decade, and Under the Radar ranked it at number 193 in its list of the "Top 200 Albums of the 2000s." In 2010, the Kitsap Sun placed it at number 73 in its list of the "Top 101 Albums of the 2000s." It also appeared in at least 24 professional lists of the best albums of 2008.

Track listing
All songs written by Peter Buck, Mike Mills and Michael Stipe, except where noted.

"Living Well Is the Best Revenge" – 3:11
"Man-Sized Wreath" – 2:32
"Supernatural Superserious" – 3:23
"Hollow Man" – 2:39
"Houston" – 2:05
"Accelerate" – 3:33
"Until the Day Is Done" – 4:08
"Mr. Richards" – 3:46
"Sing for the Submarine" – 4:50
"Horse to Water" – 2:18
"I'm Gonna DJ" – 2:07

Bonus tracks
"Red Head Walking" (Calvin Johnson) – 2:11
"Airliner" (Buck, Mills, Stipe, Scott McCaughey) – 2:21
"Horse to Water" (Live from Athens) – 2:17
"Living Well Is the Best Revenge" (Live from Athens) – 3:12
"Until the Day Is Done" (Live from Athens) – 4:06
"Supernatural Superserious" (Live from Athens) – 3:25
These bonus tracks were available in digital form from online retailers. The first two are also B-sides to the "Supernatural Superserious" single and the last was only released in the iTunes Store with pre-order copies of the album.

Charts

Weekly charts

Year-end charts

A^ The album also entered the Billboard Digital Albums at No. 2, and topped the Digital Albums and Alternative Albums charts.

Certifications and sales

}

References

External links

R.E.M.: Six Days, Ninety Nights

2008 albums
Albums produced by Jacknife Lee
R.E.M. albums
Hard rock albums by American artists
Warner Records albums
Albums produced by Peter Buck
Albums produced by Mike Mills
Albums produced by Michael Stipe
Punk rock albums by American artists